Telheiras station is the northern terminus on the Green Line of the Lisbon Metro. The station is located between Rua Prof. Francisco Gentil and Estrada de Telheiras, next to Azinhaga do Areeiro. 

The architectural design of the station is by Duarte Nuno Simões and the art installations are by Eduardo Batarda.

Connections

Urban buses

Carris 
 747 Campo Grande (Metro) ⇄ Pontinha (Metro)
 767 Campo Mártires da Pátria ⇄ Reboleira (Metro)
 778 Campo Grande (Metro) ⇄ Paço do Lumiar

See also
 List of Lisbon metro stations

References

External links

Green Line (Lisbon Metro) stations
Railway stations opened in 2002